Du är alltid en del utav mej is the debut studio album by Henrik Åberg, released in 1996.

Track listing
Bara en clown (Lasse Holm, Ingela Forsman)
There Goes My Everything (Dallas Frazier)
Jim (Red Foley, Gert Lengstrand)
Paralyzed (Otis Blackwell, Elvis Presley, Gert Lengstrand)
Love Me Tender (Elvis Presley, Vera Matson)
Du är alltid en del utav mej (Lasse Holm, Lasse Berghagen)
I Love You Because (Leon Payne)
He'll Have to Go (Joe Allison, Audrey Allison, Rose-Marie)
Blue Hawaii (Leo Robin, Ralph Rainger)
Mannen vid havet (Michael Saxell, Ingela Forsman)
Var mej nära (Lars Moberg, Lasse Berghagen)

Charts

References

1996 debut albums
Henrik Åberg albums
Swedish-language albums